Seal Cove is a town in the Canadian province of Newfoundland and Labrador, located on White Bay. The town has had a stable population of just over 300 for more than a decade.

Seal Cove is a picturesque small town located on the White Bay shore of the Baie Verte Peninsula in the northern portion of Southern Arm. The town is home to 300 friendly inhabitants that work mainly in fishing, mining, forestry industries. There is a small general store, school, and church. A trip to the local wharf will generally bring out some locals for a friendly yarn.  

Seal Cove is home to The Bond Site Lookout, named in honor of DR. Bond the founder of the lookout and constructor of the initial trail in 1981.

Dr Bond was a dentist working at the Baie Verte Hospital who had a passion for hand gliding. He discovered the hill while visiting friends in the town of Seal Cove.

In the fall and winter of 1981, he constructed a trail to the top of the hill. On June 19, 1982, Dr. Bond took his first flight off the hill while residents of the town looked on in admiration.

In the late 1980s the Town hired students to construct steps for the trail along with constructing a platform from which visitors can hand glide or admire the view.

According to residents Dr Bond glided for 15–20 minutes before landing in the local baseball field.

When planning a trip to Seal Cove's Bond Site be prepared for a steep climb of around 200 ft from the highway parking lot. The steps and platform are maintained by the town, but hikers should take care as the local weather can weaken the wood quickly and black bears are known to frequent the area.

A bear awareness course is a must for hikers who would like to travel trails in this area. St. John Ambulance - Bear Aware: Working in Bear Country (English)

Demographics 

See also
 List of cities and towns in Newfoundland and Labrador

References

Towns in Newfoundland and Labrador